The 1995 Philippine Basketball Association (PBA) Commissioner's Cup was the second conference of the 1995 PBA season. It started on June 9 and ended on September 5, 1995. The tournament is an Import-laden format, which requires an import or a pure-foreign player for each team.

Format
The following format will be observed for the duration of the conference:
The teams were divided into 2 groups.

Group A:
Alaska Milkmen
Ginebra San Miguel
San Miguel Beermen
Sta. Lucia Realtors

Group B:
Pepsi Mega Bottlers
Purefoods TJ Hotdogs
Formula Shell Gas Kings
Sunkist Orange Juicers

 Teams in a group will play against each other twice and against teams in the other group once; 10 games per team; Teams are then seeded by basis on win–loss records. Ties are broken among point differentials of the tied teams. Standings will be determined in one league table; teams do not qualify by basis of groupings.
 The top six teams after the eliminations will advance to the quarterfinals.
 Quarterfinals will be a single round robin affairs with the remaining teams. Results from the elimination round will be carried over. 
 The top four teams will advance to a best-of-five semifinal round.
SF1: #1 vs. #4
SF2: #2 vs. #3
 Best-of-three third-place playoff: losers of the semifinals
 Best-of-seven finals: winners of the semifinals

Elimination round

Team standings

Quarterfinals

Team standings

Bracket

Semifinals

(1) Sunkist vs. (4) Purefoods

(2) Sta. Lucia vs. (3) Alaska

Third place playoffs

Finals

References

External links
 PBA.ph

Commissioner's Cup
PBA Commissioner's Cup